Baumholder Army Airfield is a small military airfield in support of the United States Army facilities in Baumholder, Germany. It has a single runway in the 07/25 direction which is 16 meters (52 feet) wide and 572 meters (1,877 feet) long. It is located just north-east of the town of Reichenbach.

External links
Baumholder.army.mil

Military installations of the United States in Germany
Airports in Rhineland-Palatinate